Kurzel is a surname and may refer to:
 Jed Kurzel (born 1976), Australian film composer and musician
 Justin Kurzel (born 1974), Australian film director and screenwriter

Kurzel may also refer to:
 the old German name of Courcelles, Territoire de Belfort, France
 the old German name of Courcelles-Chaussy, France